Sati-ye Vosta (also Romanized as Sāţī-ye Vostá) is a village in Shaban Rural District, in the Central District of Meshgin Shahr County, Ardabil Province, Iran. At the 2006 census, its population was 55, in 9 families.

References 

Tageo

Towns and villages in Meshgin Shahr County